Luahna Peak is an  double summit mountain located in the Glacier Peak Wilderness of the North Cascades in Washington state. The true summit is 7400+ feet in elevation, and the northwest subpeak is 8,320+ feet. The mountain is situated in Chelan County, in the Wenatchee National Forest. The Richardson Glacier lies to the southeast of the summit, with the Pilz Glacier and Butterfly Glacier stretching across the northern slope. Precipitation runoff from the peak drains into the White River and Napeequa River, both tributaries of the Wenatchee River.

Geology

The North Cascades features some of the most rugged topography in the Cascade Range with craggy peaks, spires, ridges, and deep glacial valleys. Geological events occurring many years ago created the diverse topography and drastic elevation changes over the Cascade Range leading to various climate differences.

The history of the formation of the Cascade Mountains dates back millions of years ago to the late Eocene Epoch. With the North American Plate overriding the Pacific Plate, episodes of volcanic igneous activity persisted. In addition, small fragments of the oceanic and continental lithosphere called terranes created the North Cascades about 50 million years ago.

During the Pleistocene period dating back over two million years ago, glaciation advancing and retreating repeatedly scoured the landscape leaving deposits of rock debris. The "U"-shaped cross section of the river valleys are a result of recent glaciation. Uplift and faulting in combination with glaciation have been the dominant processes which have created the tall peaks and deep valleys of the North Cascades area.

Climate

Luahna Peak is located in the marine west coast climate zone of western North America. Most weather fronts originate in the Pacific Ocean, and travel northeast toward the Cascade Mountains. As fronts approach the North Cascades, they are forced upward by the peaks of the Cascade Range, causing them to drop their moisture in the form of rain or snowfall onto the Cascades (Orographic lift). As a result, Luahna Peak experiences high precipitation, especially during the winter months in the form of snowfall which feeds its glaciers. During winter months, weather is usually cloudy, but, due to high pressure systems over the Pacific Ocean that intensify during summer months, there is often little or no cloud cover during the summer with optimum weather for climbing Luahna from July through September.

See also

 Geography of the North Cascades
List of mountain peaks of Washington (state)

References

External links
 Luahna Peak aerial photo: PBase
 Luahna Peak's NW peak (aka "Chalangin Peak") aerial photo: PBase

Mountains of Washington (state)
Mountains of Chelan County, Washington
Cascade Range
North Cascades
North American 2000 m summits